Luis R. Sepúlveda (born February 11, 1964) is an American attorney and politician who currently serves as the New York State Senator from the 32nd Senate District, which includes parts of the Bronx. Prior to being in the state senate Sepúlveda was a member of the New York State Assembly from 2013 to 2018.

Sepúlveda is a close ally of Bill de Blasio, being the first assembly member to endorse him in his 2013 and 2017 mayoral runs.

In January 2021, Sepúlveda turned himself in and was arrested and charged with assault, criminal obstruction of breathing, and harassment, but the charges were later dropped after prosecutors determined that there was a lack of evidence to proceed to trial.

Early life and education
Sepúlveda was born in Brooklyn, New York, and graduated from Hofstra University, in Hempstead, New York, with a Bachelor of Arts degree in the natural sciences in 1988. Sepúlveda later attended the Maurice A. Deane School of Law at Hofstra on a full scholarship, obtaining his J.D. degree in 1991.

Career
In 2010, Sepúlveda made his first run for public office, losing a bid for the New York State Assembly to incumbent Peter M. Rivera in the Democratic primary. Two years later, Rivera retired and Sepúlveda was elected as his successor. He would be re-elected twice more.

Sepúlveda has a history of endorsing populist and progressive candidates. Sepúlveda was the first member of the Assembly to endorse future New York City Mayor Bill de Blasio in the 2013 New York City Mayoral primary elections as well as the first Assembly member to endorse de Blasio in his 2017 reelection campaign.

He was one of the few New York State politicians to back Vermont Senator Bernie Sanders in the 2016 Democratic Primary over former New York Senator Hillary Clinton. He endorsed Sanders again for the 2020 Primary.

However, in 2018, Sepúlveda supported incumbent state senator Martin Malave Dilan against a primary challenge from Julia Salazar, a community organizer endorsed by the Democratic Socialists of America, and endorsed former Independent Democratic Conference leader Jeffrey D. Klein against challenger Alessandra Biaggi.

New York State Assembly
While in the Assembly from 2013 to 2018, Sepúlveda served on the Assembly's Committees on Aging, Agriculture, Banks, Correction, Mental Hygiene, and Housing. Sepúlveda also serves as the chair of the Subcommittee on Transitional Services, dealing with post-incarceration issues.

New York State Senate 
In 2017, longtime Senator Rubén Díaz Sr. opted to run for the New York City Council, and won. A special election was announced to replace him, and Sepúlveda announced his candidacy on December 18, 2017. Sepúlveda would easily win the endorsement of the county Democratic party, and in the overwhelmingly Democratic district, easily won the special election.

Sepúlveda was elected to a full term in 2018 unopposed. In the Senate, he is serving as Chairman of the Crime Victims, Crime and Correction Committee. Sepúlveda sponsored the New York State Driver's License Access and Privacy Act, also known as the "Green Light" bill.

Sepúlveda was elected in 2020 and faced no major party opposition.

In support of Kathy Hochul's nomination of Hector LaSalle as chief judge of the New York Court of Appeals, Sepúlveda spoke at a press conference, saying that "I don't care if this fight costs me my political career. This is the hill I'm gonna die on."

Domestic violence charges 
In 2015, Sepúlveda's wife requested an order of protection against him after an argument between them turned violent. A restraining order was never issued.

In 2021, the police responded to a 911 call from Sepúlveda's wife. When the police arrived, both Sepúlveda and his wife claimed the other had assaulted them. Later, Sepúlveda turned himself in and was arrested for allegedly assaulting his wife, and was charged with assault in the 3rd degree, criminal obstruction of breathing, and harassment. Prosecutors dropped charges in August of that year, citing an inability to meet the burden of proof and the witness' decision to no longer testify.

Following these incidents, Andrea Stewart-Cousins removed Sepúlveda from his committee chairmanship of the Crime Victims Committee and Crime and Correction Committee, and elected officials like Nathalia Fernandez and Rob Ortt called on him to resign if the allegations were true.

See also

 List of members of the New York State Assembly
 List of Hofstra University alumni
 List of people from Brooklyn, New York
 List of people from the Bronx
 List of Bernie Sanders presidential campaign endorsements, 2016

References

External links
 Official website at the New York State Senate

1964 births
20th-century American lawyers
20th-century American politicians
21st-century American lawyers
21st-century American politicians
Hispanic and Latino American state legislators in New York (state)
Living people
Maurice A. Deane School of Law alumni
Democratic Party members of the New York State Assembly
New York (state) lawyers
Politicians from New York City
New York (state) politicians convicted of crimes
Candidates in the 2021 United States elections
Politicians from Brooklyn
Politicians from the Bronx
Hofstra University alumni